Four in the Morning is a 1965 British film directed by Anthony Simmons and starring Judi Dench. It featured a score by John Barry.

Plot

The plot revolves around the lives of two couples living in London and whether they are connected to the body of a young woman found dead on the banks of the River Thames. These two couples do not know each other.

Cast
Ann Lynn as Girl
Judi Dench as Wife
Norman Rodway as Husband
Brian Phelan as Boy
Joe Melia as Friend

Reception

Awards
Won the Golden Leopard at the 1965 Locarno International Film Festival'''
Judi Dench won the 1965 BAFTA Award for Most Promising Newcomer to Leading Film Roles

References

External links

1965 films
1965 drama films
British drama films
Films directed by Anthony Simmons
Golden Leopard winners
Films set in London
Films scored by John Barry (composer)
1960s English-language films
1960s British films
British black-and-white films